Larissa Laskin is a Canadian actress whose credits include the A&E original film, The Golden Spiders: A Nero Wolfe Mystery (2000).

Early life 
Born Larissa Lapchinski, Laskin appeared under that name in a number of stage productions in the 1980s at the Stratford Festival in Ontario.

Career 
Laskin debuted in My Secret Identity in the early 1990s. In 2002-2003, she co-starred as Dr. Rachel Griffen in the medical drama Body and Soul on the PAX network. She also appeared as a doctor held hostage by a father (Denzel Washington) in an attempt to save his son in John Q. She was nominated for a Gemini Award in 1995, 1998, and 2003.

Personal life 
She is married to fellow Canadian actor Currie Graham.

Filmography

Film

Television

References

External links

Canadian television actresses
Living people
Place of birth missing (living people)
Year of birth missing (living people)
20th-century Canadian actresses
21st-century Canadian actresses
Canadian film actresses
Canadian stage actresses